Sirivada is a village in Peddapuram Mandal in  East Godavari District of Andhra Pradesh

References
Villages in East Godavari district